Kohnush (also Romanized as Kohnūsh; also known as Kūh-ī-Nūsh and Kūh Nūsh) is a village in Khorram Rud Rural District, in the Central District of Tuyserkan County, Hamadan Province, Iran. At the 2006 census, its population was 1,735, and a total of 489 families.

References 

Populated places in Tuyserkan County